The 101st Field Artillery ("Boston Light Artillery") regiment is the oldest field artillery regiment in the United States Army with a lineage dating to 13 December 1636 when it was organized as the South Regiment. It is one of several National Guard units with colonial roots and campaign credit for the War of 1812. For the first 250 years of the unit's existence it served in infantry formations.

History
101st Field Artillery Regiment was first formed on 13 December 1636 as the South Regiment by the Massachusetts General Court. Its first commander was Colonel John Winthrop. Since its creation, the regiment has served in six colonial wars and nine American wars totalling 47 campaigns through 2010.

In addition to its own lineage, the 101st Field Artillery Regiment holds the lineage of the 180th Field Artillery Regiment, the 211th Field Artillery Regiment, the 241st Field Artillery Regiment and the 272nd Field Artillery Battalion. Battery C, 1st Battalion 101st Field Artillery holds the lineage of the 102nd Field Artillery and the Second Corps of Cadets.

Recent and current organization
The regiment currently consists of the Headquarters and Headquarters Battery, 1st Battalion, 101st Field Artillery Regiment based in Brockton, Massachusetts and an inactive Battery E, 101st Field Artillery, formerly based in Rehoboth, Massachusetts. Both units are in the Massachusetts National Guard.

Battery A, 1st Battalion, 101st Field Artillery is based in Fall River, Massachusetts. Battery B is based in Waterbury, Vermont and is part of the Vermont National Guard. Battery C, 1st Battalion 101st Field Artillery, re-activated in 2016, is based in Danvers, Massachusetts.

As part of ongoing reorganizations, the 1st Battalion, 101st Field Artillery has been part of the 26th Infantry Division Artillery (1975–1993), the 42nd Infantry Division Artillery (1993–2003), the 29th Infantry Division Artillery (2003- 2006?) and the 26th Infantry Brigade Combat Team (2006? - 2009?). Since 2009(?), the battalion has been assigned to the 86th Infantry Brigade Combat Team (IBCT), and in 2016 the 86th IBCT was reorganized under the 10th Mountain Division as part of the Army's Associated Units Program.

Battery E, 101st FA served as a target acquisition battery in the 26th Infantry Division Artillery, the 42nd Infantry Division Artillery, and the 197th Field Artillery Brigade. Battery E inactivated in (??) as part of force reductions.

Recent Overseas Actions 

 In July 2021, Headquarters and Headquarters Battery, 1st Battalion, 101st Field Artillery Regiment deployed to the Hamid Karzai International Airport in Kabul, Afghanistan as part of the defense (C-RAM) and retrograde of all remaining U.S. forces from Afghanistan and was part of the international humanitarian effort to evacuate Afghani civilians from Kabul, remaining on ground until 11:58 pm on August 30st, 2021 (2021 Kabul airlift).

Notable non-combat actions

 In August 1765, the regiment was activated to patrol the streets of Boston to help quell riots that broke out in response to the Stamp Act.(241st FA Regiment Lineage).
 In March 1770, elements of the regiment again patrolled the streets of Boston to enforce the law after the Boston Massacre.(241st FA Regiment Lineage).
 In 1786 during Shays' Rebellion, members of the regiment protected judges and the Taunton courthouse after it was surrounded by insurgents. (211th FA Lineage)
 Between July and October 1863, the regiment served in New York City to enforce draft laws after the New York Draft Riots (241st FA Regiment Lineage).
 The regiment was called into state service on 14 July 1863 during the Boston Draft riots (101st FA Regiment lineage). While manning the Cooper Street Armory in Boston's North End, the armory was attacked by over 1,000 rioters intent upon seizing the weapons stored there.  When the mob penetrated the armory's main gate, the soldiers opened fire killing and wounding dozens of rioters, effectively ending the attack.
 The regiment was reviewed by President Andrew Johnson in 1867, President Ulysses S. Grant in 1869 and President Chester A. Arthur in 1882.(241st FA Regiment Lineage).
 The regiment took part in the funeral of President Ulysses S. Grant in 1885.(241st FA Regiment Lineage).
 From 16 June to 27 November 1916, the regiment was federalized and served in Texas during the Mexican Border crises (101st FA Regiment lineage – also see Pancho Villa Expedition).
 In May 1996, Detachment 1, Headquarters Battery, 101st Field Artillery Battalion was ordered to active duty to serve with the Nordic-Polish Brigade in Bosnia in support of Operation Joint Endeavor.
 In May 1997, Echo Battery, 101st Field Artillery (TAB) was activated and served throughout Bosnia in support of Operation Joint Guard.
 After the terrorist attacks on 11 September 2001, members of the 1st Battalion 101st Field Artillery served on state orders protecting the Pilgrim Nuclear Power Plant and the Massachusetts Military Reservation at Camp Edwards.
 Select soldiers served as part of a joint operations task force providing security for the 2002 Olympic Winter Games in Salt Lake City, Utah
 The regiments howitzers fire blank rounds each Fourth of July during the Boston Pops Orchestra's playing of the 1812 Overture. It also provides howitzers to fire during a Fourth of July concert in Plymouth, Massachusetts.
 On the first Monday in June, the regiment provides a howitzer salute as part of the Ancient and Honorable Artillery Company of Massachusetts' June day drumhead election reenactment ceremony which is held on Boston Common close to the Massachusetts State House.

Notable members
 Colonel John Winthrop – First commander, South Regiment
 Captain John Underhill – First full-time training officer, Commander Boston Company
 Captain Myles Standish – First commander Plymouth Company (211th FA Lineage)
 Colonel Robert Cowden – Regimental commander who organized the unit as a three-year volunteer regiment for the Civil War.
 Corporal Nathaniel M. Allen – Was awarded the Medal of Honor for saving the regimental colors from capture during the Battle of Gettysburg.
 Major Asa M. Cook – first commander Light Artillery Company, 1st Brigade. Served in American Civil War.
 Sergeant Michael J. Kelley – While serving with Echo Battery, 101st Field Artillery (TAB) at Camp Salerno, Afghanistan was killed in action on 8 June 2005 after the helicopter landing zone he was working at was hit by rocket fire. He was the first Massachusetts National Guardsman killed in action after the terrorist attacks on 11 September 2001.
 Private Walter Brennan, three-time Academy Award-winning actor, served with the 101st in France in World War I.
 Ernest R. Redmond, United States Army officer who served with the 101st Field Artillery in World War I and was later Chief of the National Guard Bureau
 Sergeant Robert J. Barrett - While serving with Alpha Battery, 1st Battalion, 101st Field Artillery in Kabul, Afghanistan was killed in action on 19 April 2010.  SGT Barrett was posthumously awarded the Bronze Star Medal and Purple Heart Medal.

See also
 Yankee Division
 Rainbow Division
 29th Infantry Division

References

External links
 Massachusetts National Guard Home Page
 1st Battalion – 101st Field Artillery Regiment, Global Security.org

Military units and formations in Massachusetts
1636 establishments in the Thirteen Colonies
Field artillery regiments of the United States Army
Field artillery regiments of the United States Army National Guard
Military units and formations established in 1636